"Is It Really Love?" is a song by American singer Jermaine Stewart, which was released in 1989 as the fourth and final single from his third studio album Say It Again (1988). The song was written by André Cymone and Jody Watley, and produced by Cymone. The single was released in Germany only and reached No. 41.

The B-side "Search" was exclusive to the single, written by Stewart and Roy Carter. It later appeared on the 2005 compilation Attention: A Tribute to Jermaine Stewart. For the single, extended and dub remixes of "Is It Really Love?" were created.

Critical reception
On its release as a single, Music & Media described the song as "cool, funky, hi-tech disco with a staccato groove".

Formats
7" Single
"Is It Really Love?" – 4:00
"Search" – 4:23

12" Single
"Is It Really Love? (Extended Remix)" – 6:53
"Is It Really Love? (Dub Mix)" – 5:26
"Search" – 4:23

CD Single
"Is It Really Love (7" Mix)" – 4:01
"Get Lucky (Album Version)" – 4:05
"Is It Really Love? (Extended Remix)" – 6:55
"Search" – 4:23

Charts

Personnel 
 Producer on "Is It Really Love?" – André Cymone
 Remixer of "Is It Really Love? (Extended Remix)" – Phil Harding & Ian Curnow
 Remixer of "Is It Really Love? (Dub Mix)" – Phil Harding & Ian Curnow
 Additional Production, Remix on "Is It Really Love?" – Phil Harding & Ian Curnow
 Producer of "Search" – Roy Carter
 Writers of "Is It Really Love" – André Cymone, Jody Watley
 Writers of "Search" – Jermaine Stewart, Roy Carter

References

1989 singles
Jermaine Stewart songs
Songs written by André Cymone
Songs written by Jody Watley
1987 songs